The 1934 United States elections were held on November 6, 1934. The election took place in the middle of Democratic President Franklin D. Roosevelt's first term, during the Great Depression. The Democrats built on the Congressional majorities they had won in the previous two elections. In the House of Representatives, Roosevelt's party gained nine seats, mostly from the Republican Party. The Democrats also gained nine seats in the U.S. Senate, thereby winning a supermajority. A Progressive also unseated a Republican in the Senate. This marked the first time that an incumbent president's party did not lose seats in both houses in a midterm election, followed by 1998 and 2002. The feat of the president’s party seeing net gains in both the United States Senate and the governorships would not be observed again until 2022.

The election was perhaps the most successful midterm of the 20th century for the party in control of the presidency. Despite opposition from Republicans, business organizations such as the United States Chamber of Commerce, and disaffected Democrats who formed the American Liberty League, Roosevelt's New Deal policies were bolstered and his New Deal coalition was solidified. The election was critical in re-centering the Democratic Party in Northern, urban areas, as opposed to the party's traditional base in the South. Conservative Republicans also suffered major losses across the country. Future president Harry S. Truman won election as senator from Missouri during this election.

See also
1934 United States House of Representatives elections
1934 United States Senate elections
1934 United States gubernatorial elections
Kelayres massacre

References

 
1934
United States midterm elections
November 1934 events